John Davison (1793–1863), was a British theologian and author of Considerations on the Poor Laws.

References

1793 births
1863 deaths
British theologians
British religious writers